Expressway R63 is an expressway in northern Czech Republic. It is completed on the entire length and it serves as a feeder to the D8 motorway.

External links 
Info on ceskedalnice.cz 
Info on dalnice-silnice.cz 

R63